Quantum dots (QDs) are semiconductor nanoparticles with a size less than 10 nm. They exhibited size-dependent properties especially in the optical absorption and the photoluminescence (PL). Typically, the fluorescence emission peak of the QDs can be tuned by changing their diameters. So far, QDs were consisted of different group elements such as CdTe, CdSe, CdS in the II-VI category, InP or InAs in the III-V category, CuInS2 or AgInS2 in the I–III–VI2 category, and PbSe/PbS in the IV-VI category. These QDs are promising candidates as fluorescent labels in various biological applications such as bioimaging, biosensing and drug delivery.

However, most of the QDs in the commercial market are cadmium (Cd)-based QDs. Their potential toxicity in the biological environment has been debated over the past decade as the Cd2+ ions released from the QD surface are highly toxic to the cells and tissues. Thus, many researchers have focused on the development of cadmium-free quantum dots (CFQDs) in the past decade.

Optical Properties of Quantum Dots
Localized surface plasmon resonance (LSPR)characteristically occurs in quantum dots which contain a base metal like cadmium or lead. This interaction of nano-scale metals with light is characterized by surface-bound charge density oscillations of the free electrons in resonance with the driving electromagnetic field and produces a specific intensity of light. In Laymen terms, this means the valence electron of the metal oscillates up and down in resonance with the applied electromagnetic field from the natural light thus causing a different color to be emitted. For metals, the frequency at which LSPR can by tuned by adjusting the size of the nanocrystal, the geometry and the local medium. It is primarily controlled by the free electron density of the material.

However, LSPR can occur in semiconductor nanocrystals, which do no contain a base metal but instead contain a doped semiconductor like zinc selenide and Indium Phosphide, which contain appreciable free carrier densities. The LSPRs of semiconductor behave similarly to how LSPR of metals behave, meaning a their size and shape are altered the LSPR frequency should change. The key difference between semiconductor and metal nanocrystals is the ability of the semiconductors to change the "electron" or carrier concentrations. This concentration can be changed by doping the semiconductor and changing the temperature of the phase transitions.

The LSPR theoretically be changed by controlled doping of the semiconductor nanocrystals, by varying the doing concentration, the emitted frequency can be shifted thus affecting the wavelength causing a change in the color or visibility of the light. For example, by using a doping concentration of 1016 to 1019 cm−3, the resulting frequency would be in the Terahertz region, which would not produce visible but it is useful for THz imaging. If the doping concentration is increased to 10 21 cm−3, the corresponding LSPR frequency would be in the near o mid infrared region. However, semiconductor doping can be difficult to accomplish, because during the self-assembly process the nanoparticle self purifies, and as that process occurs it expels dopant atoms to the surface causing no ionized free carriers to be present and LSPR will not be achieved. The dopant atoms are expelled from the bulk material to the surface because thermodynamic equilibrium is not established and it is more energetically favorable for the dopant atoms to be expelled.

The tunability of the LSPR for semiconductor nanocrystals can also affect the intensity of the emission color, fluorescence quantum yield, lifetime of excitation, and photo stability. Semiconductor quantum dots are often called colloidal quantum dots because these dots are made from binary compounds. One of the main optical properties of colloidal quantum dots is the ability to produce fluorescence. Chemists use the fluorescence for bio labeling and chemical analysis. Since, Cadmium and other metals have been proven to be toxic in biological environments more and more of the colloidal quantum dots being produced have been cadmium free.

The ability to produce the LSPR without Cadmium is useful other labeling techniques like lateral flow immunoassay, which the fluorescence produced by various nanoparticles like carbon nanoparticles, fluorescent dyes, and quantum dots for in vivo biological labeling. In vivo labeling, it important for absorption and emission to occur in the near-infrared region to minimize the light absorption/diffusion by molecules relevant to biological systems and since cadmium free quantum dots are non toxic and ability for the frequency to tuned to the near-infrared region. The low toxicity of the cadmium free quantum allows for more research to be done in biological systems.

Applications

Doped ZnS/ZnSe QDs, graphene QDs and silicon QDs are novel CFQD types that have been demonstrated their low-toxicity and high colloidal and PL stability for in vitro and in vivo models. DNA/peptide-functionalized QDs have been widely used for targeted cell and tissue imaging and the monitoring of the drug delivery path. For example, various techniques are used for the Cd-free QDs imaging including confocal/multiphoton microscopy, CARS imaging. Through these techniques with Cd-free QDs as stable fluorescent labels, researchers can observe the cell and tissue structure with higher resolutions and in a much more biocompatible way. It is worth noting that these QDs are also flexible to conjugate with other agents such as metallic nanoparticles, radioactive labels and even Raman tags. Thus, multimodal imaging can be achieved with the multifunctional nanotags based on Cd-free QDs. Another useful application is to use these designed Cd-free QDs as nanoplatforms to do non-invasive therapeutics and diagnostics (i.e., theranostics). Recently, Cd-free QDs have also shown great potential in the fabrication of new generation of solar cells and display applications.

Quantum dots (QDs) have been a main focal point in the material science industry in the recent years, allowing scientists and engineers to manipulate and test the properties of these nanoscale particles to develop a better understanding of them. A wide variety of QDs are made from toxic heavy metals, like cadmium, which not only prohibits use in biological systems but also can be problematic in a general to a consumer buying a product composed of toxic metals. In order to combat this, researchers have been developing QDs that are not composed of these metals, such as cadmium-free QDs.
The medical field has been constantly evolving in an attempt to master the unknown about diseases, such as cancer. Much is unknown about cancer and most treatment routines includes chemotherapy, where toxic chemicals are flushed throughout the body in order to kill the cancer cells. This viscous treatment has been claiming lives for years and researchers have been heavily studying alternatives to this pathway. This is where Cd-free QDs come into play. Michael Sailor and his team including National Science Foundation (NSF)- supported researched at University of California, San Diego (UCSD), have developed the first nanoscale Cd-free QD that is able to glow brightly enough to allow physicians to examine internal organs. This image can last long enough to release cancer drugs before breaking down into harmless by-products. Silicon wafers were used, this way when they were broken down in the body, silicic acid is formed which is already present in the body which is needed for proper bone and tissue growth.

Examples
Zinc sulfide
One type of material that is used as an alternative to quantum dots that contain cadmium and other heavy metals are zinc type quantum dots. Sulfur, oxygen, and selenium are often attached to the zinc component for the final quantum dots. A very interesting use of zinc sulfide quantum dots is the detection of food toxins including the harmful toxin, aflatoxin- B1. Aflatoxin B1 is a very toxic compound that can cause serious and permanent harm to the human body including liver failure. Another use for the zinc sulfide quantum dot involves the pure zinc sulfide quantum dot to remove naphthalene by the use of photocatalytic methodology. In this specific experiment a zinc sulfide quantum dot was used to photodegrade the molecule naphthalene which was used as a model to describe industrial pollutant molecules. Another application of this technique involves using Zinc Sulfide quantum dots to treat industrial waste water.
Indium
An alternative to the heavy metal quantum dots are quantum dots that contain Indium. One example is the use of CuInS2 quantum dots as fluorescent labels that emit light in the near infrared region of the visible spectrum. In this specific experiment these CuInS2 nanoparticles were placed inside of silica beads. Studies including the cytotoxicity and photoluminescence were performed. Due to the high quantum yield obtained (30–50 percent), low overall toxicity, and the overall stability of the particles in solution lead to the conclusion that cells could be imaged using synthetic particles. An additional application of the CuInS2 quantum dots involved the drug delivery of an anticancer drug named doxorubicin (DOX). In this experiment the CuInS2 quantum dots were capped with L-cysteine. The anticancer drug was released by the fluorescent quenching of the synthesized quantum dots which additionally provided images of the cancer cells while the drug was being released. Results obtained from the experiment were positive with low toxic effects on the cells from the quantum dots, and good activity from the anticancer drug.
Another type of quantum dot composed of indium is the InP quantum dot. Due to the lower photoluminescent intensity and the lower quantum yield of InP they are coated with a material with a larger band gap like ZnS.
One application with InP quantum dots coated with zinc sulfide involved the creation of LED with tunable photo luminescent emissions. Fabrication of the quantum dot LED involved a blue chip as a blue light source and a silicon resin containing the quantum dots on top of the chip creating the sample, with good results obtained from the experiment.
Silicon
A third type of quantum dot that does not contain heavy metals is the silicon quantum dot. These silicon quantum dots can be used in numerous situations which include photochemical and biological applications such as the use of silicon layers for photovoltaic applications. In an experiment using silicon quantum dots near the interface of the substrate and the quantum dots, the power conversion efficiency of the solar cell increased. Silicon quantum dots can also be used as optical labels and drug delivery detection systems, in addition to being used detect formaldehyde in water. The silicon quantum dots emitted stable fluorescence over pH values (2–14) and exhibited strong tolerance to salt and additional reagents. Detection involving formaldehyde quenching the fluorescence of the water soluble silicon dots showing the application of silicon quantum dots involving biochemical detection.

See also

 Carbon quantum dot
 Carbon nanotube quantum dot
 Graphene quantum dot
 Nanocrystal solar cell
 Nanoparticle
 Quantum dot

References

Quantum dots